The 1990 Georgia Tech Yellow Jackets football team represented the Georgia Institute of Technology in the 1990 NCAA Division I-A football season. The Jackets posted an undefeated 11–0–1 record. For the season the Yellow Jackets offense scored 379 points while the defense allowed 186 points. Highlights from the season included a nationally televised win over #1 Virginia on the road and a defeat of archrival Georgia for the second consecutive year.  Georgia Tech capped off the season by defeating Nebraska, 45–21, in the Florida Citrus Bowl. Head coach Bobby Ross and the Yellow Jackets were awarded a share of the national championship, winning the UPI Poll title by one vote over Colorado, who won the AP Poll title. The team was selected national champion by the UPI coaches poll, Dunkel, and Sagarin (ELO-Chess), while co-national champion by both FACT and NCF.

Schedule

Sources.

Roster

Rankings

Game summaries

NC State

Chattanooga

South Carolina

at Maryland

Clemson

at North Carolina

Duke

at Virginia

The most notable victory for the Yellow Jackets came on November 3 against #1 ranked Virginia at Scott Stadium. The game was televised nationally by CBS with Jim Nantz handling play-by-play duties. Georgia Tech won 41–38 thanks to a 37-yard field goal by Scott Sisson with seven seconds remaining. The win vaulted Georgia Tech to the #7 ranking in both major polls.

Virginia Tech

at Wake Forest

at Georgia

vs. Nebraska (Citrus Bowl)

Awards and honors
Bobby Ross – Bobby Dodd Coach of the Year Award, Paul "Bear" Bryant Award, Sporting News College Football Coach of the Year, Walter Camp Coach of the Year Award, Eddie Robinson Coach of the Year Award, ACC Coach of the Year
Ken Swilling – Consensus First-team All-American

Team players drafted into the NFL

Source.

References

Georgia Tech
Georgia Tech Yellow Jackets football seasons
College football national champions
Atlantic Coast Conference football champion seasons
Citrus Bowl champion seasons
College football undefeated seasons
Georgia Tech Yellow Jackets football